The Madagascar Tribune is a daily newspaper published in Antananarivo, Madagascar. It is primarily in French, with several articles in Malagasy. 

The Madagascar-tribune.com is an independent online newspaper, published by the Society Malagasy Edition (SME). The journal exists since December 1988, and became an independent online newspaper on 29 January 2009.

See also
 List of newspapers in Madagascar

External links
Madagascar Tribune online edition
Madagascar Tribune on  Africa Parliamentary Knowledge Network

Newspapers published in Madagascar
Publications with year of establishment missing
Publications established in 1988